This is a list of human spaceflights in Tiangong program.

Past

Ongoing

Future

References 

 

Tiangong